Verongula is a genus of sea sponges in the family Aplysinidae. 

The following species are recognised in the genus Verongula:
Verongula gigantea (Hyatt, 1875)
Verongula reiswigi Alcolado, 1984
Verongula rigida (Esper, 1794)

References

 
Sponge genera
Taxa named by Addison Emery Verrill